Mahmud Kian (also Romanized as Maḩmūd Kīān) is a village in Taher Gurab Rural District, in the Central District of Sowme'eh Sara County, Gilan Province, Iran. At the 2006 census, its population was 397, in 109 families.

References 

Populated places in Sowme'eh Sara County